Denison Dam, also known as Lake Texoma Dam, is a dam located on the Red River between Texas and Oklahoma that impounds Lake Texoma. The purpose of the dam is flood control, water supply, hydroelectric power production, river regulation, navigation and recreation. It was also designated by the American Society of Civil Engineers as a National Historic Civil Engineering Landmark in 1993.

History
Completed in 1943 primarily as a flood control project, it was at the time the "largest rolled-earth fill dam in the world". It takes its name from Denison, Texas, just downriver from the damface.

Denison Dam contains a total of 18.8 million cubic yards (14,000,000 m³) of rolled-earth fill.
[...] General Lucius D. Clay was the principal manager of the project.

Oklahoma State Highway 91 and, to a lesser extent, Texas State Highway 91 cross over the dam.

References

External links

Army Corp on floodstage, Retrieved July 6, 2007
ASCE Denison Dam landmark page, Retrieved January 26, 2022

Buildings and structures in Bryan County, Oklahoma
Buildings and structures in Grayson County, Texas
Dams in Oklahoma
Dams in Texas
Historic Civil Engineering Landmarks
Hydroelectric power plants in Texas
Hydroelectric power plants in Oklahoma
Earth-filled dams
United States Army Corps of Engineers dams
Energy infrastructure completed in 1943
Dams completed in 1943
Red River of the South